Nicole Sassine (born 24 November 1989) is a Canadian sprinter. She competed in the 4 × 400 metres relay event at the 2015 World Championships in Athletics in Beijing, China.

References

External links
 
 

1989 births
Living people
Canadian female sprinters
World Athletics Championships athletes for Canada
Place of birth missing (living people)